Teclea carpopunctifera is a small forest tree in the family Rutaceae. The genus Teclea has been synonymized with Vepris, but this species appears not to have been given a name in Vepris and is regarded as "unplaced" by Plants of the World Online. It is endemic to Côte d'Ivoire.

References

Rutaceae
Endemic flora of Ivory Coast
Trees of Africa
Vulnerable flora of Africa
Taxonomy articles created by Polbot